Don't Trust the Mafia is a 1979 Italian crime film directed by Mario Bianchi.

Production
Don't Trust the Mafia was filmed at R.T.A. Elios in Rome and on location in Aversa. It was one of the three crime films director Mario Bianchi filmed in Naples between 1978 and 1979.

Release
Don't Trust the Mafia was released in Italy on 12 May 1979, where it was distributed by ASA Cinematografica. The film grossed 16.5 million Italian lira on its theatrical release. The film was released with the English-language title on Danish VHS as Don't Trust the Mafia.

Reception
In a retrospective review, Roberto Curti stated that Bianchi's direction was "perfunctory as ever" with his "shoestring budget" being revealed "in every shot".

References

Footnotes

Sources

External links
 

1979 films
1979 crime films
Italian crime films
Films shot in Rome
Films shot in Naples
Films directed by Mario Bianchi
1970s Italian-language films
1970s Italian films